PepsiAmericas, Inc. was the world's second-largest bottler of Pepsi-Cola products, under contract with product owner PepsiCo. PepsiAmericas also held contracts to produce beverages for Dr Pepper Snapple Group and smaller regional brands.  PepsiAmericas had 19 bottling plants in the United States and had a presence in 11 countries in Central/Eastern Europe and 5 countries in the Caribbean. PepsiAmericas was based in Minneapolis, Minnesota.

By early 2009, PepsiCo held a 41.1% stake in the PepsiAmericas. On April 20, 2009, PepsiCo offered to buy the remaining portion of PepsiAmericas, at an offer of $23.27 – or $11.64 plus 0.223 PepsiCo shares – in exchange for each PepsiAmericas share. In August 2009, PepsiCo also made an offer for Pepsi Bottling Group, the world's largest bottler of Pepsi-Cola products. On February 26, 2010, after regulatory review, PepsiCo's acquisitions of the two bottling companies was completed, forming a new, wholly owned subsidiary, the Pepsi Beverages Company.

History

In 2000, Whitman Corp., a Pepsi bottler, purchased PepsiAmericas and took the acquired company's name. Whitman was founded as the Illinois Central Railroad. It later diversified out of railroads and into Pepsi bottling, going by the names Illinois Central Industries in 1962, IC Industries in 1975 and Whitman Corp. in 1988.

References

External links
 PepsiAmericas, Inc.
 Company profile at answers.com.

Defunct companies based in Minneapolis
Drink companies of the United States
Illinois Central Railroad
Food and drink companies established in 1962
Food and drink companies disestablished in 2010
PepsiCo bottlers
1962 establishments in Minnesota
2010 disestablishments in Minnesota